S-Methylcysteine is the amino acid with the nominal formula CH3SCH2CH(NH2)CO2H.  It is the S-methylated derivative of cysteine. This amino acid occurs widely in plants, including many edible vegetables.

Biosynthesis
The amino acid is not genetically coded, but it arises by post-translational methylation of cysteine.  One pathway involves methyl transfer from alkylated DNA by zinc-cysteinate-containing repair enzymes.

Beyond its biological context, it has been examined as a chelating agent.

References

Biochemistry
Sulfur amino acids
Thioethers
Amino acid derivatives